Rudo Karume (born 1 December 1989) is a former Zimbabwean netball player who represented Zimbabwe internationally and played in the position of goal defense. She was a member of the Zimbabwean squad which finished at eighth position during the 2019 Netball World Cup, which was historically Zimbabwe's first ever appearance at a Netball World Cup tournament. She announced her retirement from the sport at the age of 29 following the 2019 World Cup.

References 

1989 births
Living people
Zimbabwean netball players
2019 Netball World Cup players